Opisthotropis maculosa, the yellow-spotted mountain stream snake or yellow-spotted mountain keelback,  is a species of natricine snake found in Thailand.

References

Opisthotropis
Reptiles described in 2007
Reptiles of Thailand